Four Murders Are Enough, Darling is a 1971 Czechoslovak comedy film directed by Oldřich Lipský. It is an adaptation of the 1960 novel Entry Forbidden to The Dead by Croatian writer and comic artist , which was previously adapted into a Yugoslav film  in 1965.

Plot 
The film setting is a fictional country in the West. The protagonist, George Camel is a humble schoolteacher, who is mistaken for a dangerous murderer. Subsequently, two criminal gangs vie for his services.

Cast 
Lubomír Lipský as George Camel
Jiřina Bohdalová as Sabrina
Iva Janžurová as Kate Draxl
Marie Rosůlková as Mrs. Harrington
František Filipovský as Detective Sheridan
Jan Libíček as Brooks
Josef Hlinomaz as Gogo
Karel Effa as Bar Owner Kovarski
Lubomír Kostelka as Officer Davidson
Vlastimil Hašek as Officer Harley
Stella Zázvorková as Prostitute Peggy
Josef Kemr as Zubatý (Tooth Man)
Jaroslav Moučka as Gangster Tom
František Peterka as Francis Owens
Jan Přeučil as Henry

References

External links
 

1971 films
1971 comedy films
Czechoslovak comedy films
Films directed by Oldřich Lipský
Czech action comedy films
1970s action comedy films
1970s Czech-language films
1970s Czech films